The Nquthu Local Municipality council consists of thirty-seven members elected by mixed-member proportional representation. Nineteen councillors are elected by first-past-the-post voting in nineteen wards, while the remaining eighteen are chosen from party lists so that the total number of party representatives is proportional to the number of votes received.

In the election of 1 November 2021 the IFP won a majority of nineteen seats.

Results 
The following table shows the composition of the council after past elections.

December 2000 election

The following table shows the results of the 2000 election.

March 2006 election

The following table shows the results of the 2006 election.

May 2011 election

The following table shows the results of the 2011 election.

August 2016 election

The following table shows the results of the 2016 election.

February 2017 special election 

By February 2017, the Nquthu Local Municipality had failed to form a council and appoint a mayor. The KwaZulu-Natal Cooperative Governance and Traditional Affairs MEC Nomusa Dube-Ncube dissolved the then elected members positions on 9 February 2017, effective from 23 February with elections to be held 25 May 2017. A coalition of Inkatha Freedom Party (IFP), Democratic Alliance (DA) and Economic Freedom Fighters (EFF) held the majority control by one seat over the ANC's coalition of seventeen seats. The DA and IFP blamed the ANC for the lack of progress. The DA would welcome the MEC's decision but the IFP was not happy about it.

In the special election held on 25 May 2017, the IFP won a majority of 58% of the vote and 19 seats on the council. The following table shows the results of the election.

November 2021 election

The following table shows the results of the 2021 election.

References

Nquthu
Elections in KwaZulu-Natal
Umzinyathi District Municipality